Eyston is a surname. Notable people with the surname include:

 Bernard Eyston (1628–1709), English Franciscan friar
 Charles Eyston (1667–1721), English antiquary
 George Eyston (1897–1979), British racing car driver, engineer, and inventor

See also
 Easton (surname)
 Eston (name)